Time & Time Again is a role-playing game published by Timeline Ltd. in 1984.

Description
Time & Time Again is a time-travel system featuring combat rules that can be used for any historical period. PCs can't change the past; they are employed to protect observing time-travel scholars or track down time travelers who have gone berserk. The emphasis is on interacting with historical societies, not altering them. The game includes character creation, maps, charts, and three sample scenarios.

Publication history
Time & Time Again was designed by H.N. Voss and W.P. Worzel, and published by Timeline Ltd. in 1984 as a boxed set containing a 52-page book and a 48-page book, and three four-page pamphlets.

Reception
William A. Barton reviewed Time and Time Again in Space Gamer No. 76. Barton commented that "if you prefer a lot of background info, relatively simply but realistic mechanics, and straight, 'hard' sf in your time traveling, over less background, more mechanics, and a science-fantasy approach – and you don't mind researching your own scenarios – Time and Time Again is the time-travel RPG for you. If the opposite, stick with Timemaster."

Reviews
Different Worlds #40 (July/Aug., 1985)
Adventurer (Issue 1 - Apr 1986)

References

Role-playing games introduced in 1984
Time travel and multiple reality role-playing games